The Griswolds are an Australian two-piece indie rock band from Sydney, Australia. The band have cited influences such as Vampire Weekend, MGMT, Kanye West, Devendra Banhart, Of Montreal, and the Beach Boys. The Griswolds signed with Wind-up Records in May 2013 and began recording their debut album shortly after with producer Tony Hoffer. They are named after the fictional family from the Vacation film series.

On 16 March 2017, Tim John, their bass player, left the band.
 Lead singer Chris Whitehall was accused of sexual misconduct by several fans in September 2020.

Background
The Griswolds formed in February 2012. The band's single "Heart of a Lion", reached #12 on the We Are Hunted emerging artists list.

The Griswolds became a Triple J Unearthed feature artist after winning a slot on the 2012 Parklife Festival line-up alongside Passion Pit and The Presets. Their Heart of a Lion EP, released in 2012, received positive reviews, and helped start their touring career. After success touring in their native Australia, the band made their first live appearance in New York City on 11 May 2013 at the Brooklyn Bowl. The band began recording their debut album with producer Tony Hoffer in January 2014.

The official music video for "Red Tuxedo" premiered on the VICE Noisey website on Valentine's Day (14 February), 2014. The band's song "Beware the Dog" is the first song vocalist Chris Whitehall and lead guitarist Daniel Duque-Perez wrote together. Whitehall described it as being "about losing someone we were really close with to heavy drug use. [... It's] about that journey – the good and the bad times."

In March 2015, the band confirmed that once they return to Australia, following their tour alongside Passion Pit, they were going to commence work on their second album.

The first single off their second album, Out of My Head, was released on 12 August 2016. High Times for Low Lives, was released on 11 November 2016.

In September 2016, the band was picked as Elvis Duran's Artist of the Month in the United States and was featured on NBC's Today show hosted by Kathie Lee Gifford and Hoda Kotb and broadcast nationally where they performed live the single "Out of My Head".

On 30 August 2019, the band released Nice To Meet Ya!, the lead single off of their second EP and first release since 2016.

In September 2020, lead singer Chris Whitehall was accused of sexual misconduct by multiple underage fans. Whitehall apologized and admitted to the allegations, saying "It is with a heavy heart that I am confirming that the statements I have read are true and I am here to take full responsibility and ownership of my actions."

Discography

Studio albums

Extended plays
2014: Heart of a Lion
2020: All My Friends

Singles

Awards and accolades
"Beware the Dog" was voted #28 on the Triple J Hottest 100, 2014
"Beware the Dog" was voted #4 on the Sirius XM Alt Nation Alt 36 annual countdown 
"Beware the Dog" was nominated by Rolling Stone as Best Video Clip and Single of the year for 2014
"Beware the Dog" Spent 4 weeks at #1 and a total of 16 weeks on the Sirius XM Alt Nation Alt 18 Countdown in 2014 
"Beware the Dog" Was chosen as the 4th best Alternative Rock Single of 2014 by Billboard 
"If You Wanna Stay" Debuted at #18 on the Sirius XM Alt Nation Alt 18 countdown the day after the single was released on US radio climbing to #17 the following week 
Debut album "Be Impressive" Charted at #5 on the USA iTunes Charts  
"Heart of a Lion" was voted #141 on the Triple J Hottest 100, 2012
"Heart of a Lion" charted at #12 on the We Are Hunted Emerging Artists chart
"Mississippi" charted at #8 on US college radio's (CMJ) indie chart
Featured on festival line-ups across the globe

References

External links
 The Griswolds' website
 The Griswolds' Facebook
 The Griswolds' Bandcamp
 The Griswolds' Twitter
 Wind-up Records
 The Griswolds on Last.fm
  Jimmy Howes

Australian indie rock groups
Musical groups established in 2012
Musical groups from Sydney
2012 establishments in Australia